STFF may refer to:

 Subtrochenteric femoral fracture (STFF), see Hip fracture#Diagnosis
 Star Trek V: The Final Frontier (ST:FF), a science-fiction film
 Stockholms Fotbollförbund (STFF), the soccer association of Stockholm, Sweden